Coleophora iranella is a moth of the family Coleophoridae. It is found in Iran.

References

iranella
Moths described in 1959
Moths of the Middle East